Laguindingan Airport, also referred to as Laguindingan International Airport, is an international airport in Northern Mindanao that serves the cities of Cagayan de Oro, Iligan, and Marawi, as well as the provinces of Misamis Oriental, Lanao del Norte and Bukidnon. The airport is Mindanao's second-busiest airport after Francisco Bangoy International Airport in Davao City. It It is classified as a Class 1 principal (major domestic) airport by the Civil Aviation Authority of the Philippines (CAAP), a body of the Department of Transportation (DOTr) responsible for implementing policies on civil aviation to assure safe, economic and efficient air travel, and the handling of operations at airports (except major international ones).

It opened on June 15, 2013, and replaced both Lumbia Airport (now Lumbia Airfield) in Lumbia, Cagayan de Oro and Maria Cristina Airport in Maria Cristina, Iligan. Lumbia Airport now serves as a military air base for the Philippine Air Force, while Maria Cristina Airport in Iligan serves general aviation.

History

Funding and implementation

The airport project was implemented by the Philippine Government through the Department of Transportation and Communications. After the completion of the project, the airport was turned-over to the Civil Aviation Authority of the Philippines. The airport project envisages the development of new major trunkline airports compliant to international standards of safety and operations to meet the air transportation demand of the region. The airport project also aims to boost economic activities, specifically of the Cagayan-Iligan Corridor, and expects to serve as the gateway to Northern Mindanao.

The approved cost of the airport project is US$167.09 million or ₱7.853 billion. The cost was duly approved by the National Economic and Development Authority Board on August 30, 2007. Plans for the upgrade have existed since 1991 but have been stymied by land acquisition and financing problems. Although the Philippine Government has signed a US$25 million soft loan agreement with the South Korean government through its Economic Development Cooperation Fund, there has been difficulty in raising counterpart funding for acquisition of the estimated 300 hectares of land eventually required by the airport complex.

The Laguindingan Airport Development Project was inaugurated on January 10, 2006, with groundbreaking ceremonies presided by President Gloria Macapagal Arroyo, who advocated the idea of an international airport along the Cagayan de Oro-Iligan Corridor.

Construction and opening
By July 2007, the construction of the  four-lane access road had started to connect the new airport to the national road.

In early 2008, grading of the airport site area started. It was headed by the Department of Transportation and Communications and its foreign and local consultants, South Korea-based Yooshin Engineering Corporation and Ortigas Center, Pasig-based SCHEMA Konsult, Inc. respectively, and Hanjin Heavy Industries and Construction Company as the general contractor for the project.

President Benigno Aquino III expected that the opening of the airport would happen in April 2013. However, on April 18, 2013, the DOTC announced that the opening would be pushed back to June 15, 2013 because CAAP had received requests from airlines to postpone the transfer until after the summer peak season, as an April 30 opening would require the cancellation of several daily trips. It was inaugurated by President Aquino on June 13, 2013, two days before its opening.

Contemporary history

Laguindingan Airport was expected to facilitate night landings by December 2014, upon the completion of the installation of various navigational systems. However, it was only on March 12, 2015, that the airport began to accommodate night flights. With this recent development, operating hours were increased to 5:00 am to 9:00 pm PST from the previous 6:00 am to 6:00 pm PST daily schedule.

On October 20, 2017, Cebu Pacific launched the airport as its seventh hub, with its regional subsidiary Cebgo adding flights to Caticlan and Dumaguete from the airport.

Philippine Airlines opened a Mabuhay Lounge at the airport in January 2018, but has been closed since March 2020 due to the COVID-19 pandemic.

Future development

Upgrading and expansion
In August 2013, the Project Development and Monitoring Facility Board had approved for the revision of the operations and maintenance of the airport. The operations and maintenance were already approved for funding but were revised to include the construction of a new terminal to the winning PPP bidder. The Department of Transportation and Communications was tasked to construct the terminal along with other airside civil works, air navigational facilities, landside building works, as well as other facilities. The revision is part of maintaining the airport on par with ICAO standards.

On February 26, 2019, Aboitiz InfraCapital Inc. was granted by CAAP an Original Proponent Status (OPS) for its unsolicited proposal for the airport's upgrade, expansion, operations, and maintenance.

According to the Civil Aviation Authority of the Philippines and airport manager Jose Bodiongan, the airport would become the “busiest regional transportation hub” with the installation of the runway lights, navigation equipment (required for nighttime flights) and the purchase of two new fire trucks.

An expansion of the passenger and cargo terminals and parking lot are being planned. With the large South Korean presence in Cagayan de Oro, the regional Department of Tourism is eyeing flights from Busan to Cagayan de Oro via Singapore or a direct route from Busan to Cagayan de Oro to further bolster the tourism industry in the region. The CAAP was set to initially approve Busan-Cagayan de Oro and Seoul-Cagayan de Oro flights by the fourth quarter of 2015.

Aerotropolis
Ayala Land, who owned 183 of the 417 hectares of land acquired by the government to develop the airport complex, has future plans to develop an aerotropolis around the airport. This is part of the pre-conditions granted by Civil Aviation Authority of the Philippines for expropriating the lands the government bought from the corporation. Ayala Corporation, the parent company of Ayala Land, is one of the bidders in privatizing, through the public-private partnership scheme, the operations and maintenance of the airport.

In September 2017, Ayala Land is set to build its first industrial estate outside Luzon within the planned aerotropolis.

Structure

Passenger terminal
The airport has a  passenger terminal building that can accommodate 1.6 million passengers a year. The airport can accommodate 2,000 passengers a day.

Runway
The airport has a single  runway which can accommodate four takeoffs and landings an hour.

The runway is equipped with an instrument landing system, making it capable of night landings.

Airlines and destinations

Statistics
Data from Civil Aviation Authority of the Philippines (CAAP).

Notes

Gallery

See also

 List of airports in the Philippines
 Lumbia Airport (former airport)
 Northern Mindanao

References

External links

 Laguindingan International Airport – Official Website
 Civil Aviation Authority of the Philippines – Official Website

2013 establishments in the Philippines
Airports established in 2013
Airports in the Philippines
Buildings and structures in Misamis Oriental
Cagayan de Oro